Ślopek may refer to:
 Józef Juraszek Ślopek (1824-1907), Polish pioneer in setting bones
 Stefan Ślopek (1914-1995), Polish microbiologist and immunologist

Polish-language surnames